Bryson High School or Bryson School is a public secondary school located in Bryson, Texas (USA) and classified as a 1A school by the UIL. It is part of the Bryson Independent School District located in west central Jack County.  In 2015, the school was rated "Met Standard" by the Texas Education Agency.

Athletics
The Bryson Cowboys compete in these sports - 

Cross Country, Volleyball, 6-Man Football, Basketball, Softball & Baseball

State Finalist

Girls Basketball - 
1953(B)

References

External links
Bryson ISD

Schools in Jack County, Texas
Public high schools in Texas
Public middle schools in Texas
Public elementary schools in Texas